The Meaning of Mariah Carey is a memoir by Mariah Carey, released on September 29, 2020. It was written with Michaela Angela Davis, and was published by Andy Cohen Books, an imprint of Henry Holt, as well as in an audiobook format read by Carey herself on Audible. The book navigates the complex racial, social, cultural and familial tensions associated with Carey's upbringing as a biracial woman in Long Island, New York. This is framed alongside first-hand descriptions of the singer's personal and professional triumphs and struggles, and is interspersed with fragments of Carey's songwriting output.

The memoir was met with critical acclaim and commercial success, becoming a number-one New York Times Best Seller after its first week of release. To promote the memoir, Carey made a series of public appearances on a range of talk shows, including an interview with Oprah Winfrey on The Oprah Conversation.

Background
Mariah Carey had considered writing a memoir since 2010 when she was pregnant with her twins Moroccan and Monroe. In the two years prior to The Meaning of Mariah Careys release, she told stories to co-writer Michaela Angela Davis. The book was first rumored in April 2018, and Carey acknowledged she was working on it during promotional appearances for her fifteenth studio album Caution (2018). On July 9, 2020, she announced the memoir was complete, and subsequently released the book on September 29, 2020.

Contents
The book includes a preface and epilogue and is divided into four parts: "Wayward Child", "Sing. Sing.", "All That Glitters", and "Emancipation". It focuses on Carey's childhood, career, and personal and professional relationships, with less of a focus on events after 2001. Alongside the plot, the inspirations and meanings of many of Carey's songs are explained and are often accompanied by excerpts from them. Chapters occasionally begin or end with lyrics from Carey's songs as epigraphs, and Bible verses are incorporated.

Media outlets noted that men associated with her such as Eminem and former fiancé James Packer are absent. Her role as a judge on American Idol and feud with Nicki Minaj is unrecognized. She explained: "If somebody or something didn't pertain to the actual meaning of Mariah Carey, as is the title, then they aren't in the book."

Plot summary
Carey witnessed violence in her family at a young age; fights occurred between her older brother Morgan and parents Alfred and Patricia. She used music as an escape from such situations and sang herself lullabies. Patricia and a childhood friend recognized Carey's vocal talent; their validation was her raison d'être. Immersed in music as a profession before she was a teenager, Carey was "learning the craft, sitting in on jam sessions with accomplished jazz musicians with [Patricia] and developing the skills of scatting and improvisation". Their mother-daughter relationship deteriorated, however, after Patricia warned Carey "you should only hope that one day you become half the singer I am". Carey was neglected as a child and her safety was disregarded by Patricia. She felt inferior because of her unkempt matted hair and experiences with racism, including being called a nigger by a group of white girls. Her relationship with older sister Alison "was manipulation masquerading as love". She brought twelve-year-old Carey to a whorehouse and her pimp boyfriend kissed Carey at a drive-in theater. Alison also drugged Carey and gave her third-degree burns.

After graduating from high school, Carey moved to New York City and began working with other musicians, including Brenda K. Starr, who introduced her to Tommy Mottola. Carey signed with his record label, and they entered a working relationship. Mottola began advancing romantic gestures, and she was attracted to him for the "sense of home" he provided. Mottola was determined to marry her, and Carey agreed in hoping he would loosen his grasp on her life. The marriage was strained as soon as their honeymoon, however, and "the control and imbalance of power ... accelerated." Mottola stifled her voice, removed blackness from her music and appearance, and prevented her from realizing she was appreciated by others. As she was monitored with security cameras and an intercom system inside of the house and secretly followed by Mottola's security when leaving it, Carey likens herself to a captive and their mansion a prison. While he "tried to destroy" her, she began a covert relationship with Derek Jeter, and their encounters deepened her music on Butterfly. Coupled with Jeter, Carey separated from Mottola after he dragged a butter knife down her face. She later divorced him and left Sony Music for Virgin Records.

Carey's first album on her new label would be the soundtrack to Glitter. However, Mottola continued to exert control over her career by interfering with both the film and album. To spite her after leaving him, the script became reductive and two of the soundtrack's songs were used to create similar-sounding ones for Jennifer Lopez. Combined with her demanding schedule, Mottola's meddling, and a tabloid frenzy over her appearance on MTV's Total Request Live where she passed out popsicles to fans and taking her clothes off to reveal scantily clad clothing in the process, Carey was crippled with anxiety, fear, and exhaustion. Having almost no sleep in nearly a week, Morgan directed Carey to rest at their mother's house, only to be woken up by Patricia telling her to go back to work. Carey verbally lashed out at Patricia, who called the police on her. Morgan convinced Carey to enter two facilities, both of which were unsuited to her needs. She was released from the second after the September 11 attacks and went on to promote Glitter. Carey entered therapy following these experiences and was diagnosed with somatization. She realized her family "watched and waited for [her] to fall, like scavengers, so that they might gain control over [her] fortune", and was advised to no longer have contact with her siblings.

After departing Virgin for Universal Records, Carey recorded Charmbracelet, "a place of shelter, healing, and growth that made it possible for [her] to bloom again". Prior to its release, she made peace with Alfred before he died and realized he was proud of her. She also reconnected with God by being rebaptized and beginning a three-year study of the Bible. Carey appreciated the commercial success of The Emancipation of Mimi and critical response to her role in Precious for their ability to make both the public and herself move on from Glitter. After starting a relationship with Nick Cannon, they quickly married to have children. She gave birth to twins following a miscarriage and considers them living proof a "cycle of brokenness" can end. The couple later divorced because "making the necessary adjustments to being working parents in entertainment took its toll". Carey concludes by expressing her delight in "All I Want for Christmas Is You" reaching number one on the Billboard Hot 100 for the first time in 2019 and how fulfilled she now feels as a person.

Style and genre
Book reviewers felt Carey's experiences in her youth do not reflect her persona as a diva. While not only about hardship, Victoria Segal of The Sunday Times considered it more serious than gossip-oriented celebrity memoirs. Writing for The Guardian, Alex Macpherson described the book as "not the glitzy, gossipy celebrity reminiscence some might expect, but instead a largely sombre dive into her past" due to the significant length about her traumatic childhood. Times Cady Lang agreed, regarding the inclusion of Carey's relationship with Alison as "not a happy reminiscence on that time in her life, but instead a desire to heal from it". According to Véronique Hyland of Elle, "the reality of living with a flawed past and coping with the present" is the central theme. Noting its title is The Meaning of Mariah Carey—not The Making of Mariah Carey—Emily Lordi stated in The New Yorker that the book covers Carey's troubled youth more than her efforts to become successful. Rich Juzwiak concurred in the Los Angeles Times: "Much of the focus is not on what she has done but what was done to her."

Despite the book's subject matter, critics thought it purposely plays up her diva image and contains humor. Writing for the Irish Independent, Dónal Lynch said it "hams up Carey's reputation as the Marie Antoinette of pop". Aside from chapters before Carey's fame, Fiona Sturges of The Guardian thought it contains "a twinkling humour". Referring to the passage "I really don't want a lot for Christmas—particularly not the cops", Macpherson felt "Carey recounts many of the worst parts of her life with a deadpan, self-aware wit". The Financial Times Ludovic Hunter-Tilney described the book as "laced with dry wit", and Segal thought "she cracks enough jokes to suggest she would be great fun over an unguarded bottle of wine". Hannah Reich of ABC News thought Carey's humor was pronounced in the audiobook version as it is aided by her speaking voice. According to Kirkus Reviews, the best parts of the memoir are those in which her personality is apparent. Variety wrote "you can ... hear every sentence perfectly in [Carey's] voice". Citing comments about getting her hair done after the September 11 attacks and referring to Jennifer Lopez as "another female entertainer ... (whom I don't know)", Rob Sheffield of Rolling Stone felt "every page is packed with her over-the-top personality". Readers are often addressed as "dahlings".

Publication and promotion
The Meaning of Mariah Carey was published on September 29, 2020, as one of the first releases by Andy Cohen Books, an imprint of Henry Holt and Company. To promote the memoir, Carey discussed the book in several televised interviews on American morning and late-night talk shows. With Jane Pauley on CBS News Sunday Morning, she talked about her troubled childhood, marriage to Mottola, and the events of Glitter. On CBS This Morning with Gayle King, she focused on the strained relationship with her mother. Carey explained the purpose of writing the memoir and the process of recording the alternative rock album Someone's Ugly Daughter during an interview with Stephen Colbert on The Late Show. On Watch What Happens Live with Andy Cohen and The Daily Show with Trevor Noah, she described early experiences with racism. During an episode of her Apple TV+ show The Oprah Conversation, Carey spoke with Oprah Winfrey about the impact that her unique hair had as a young girl and her relationship with Derek Jeter. In an interview with Trevor Nelson on BBC Radio 2, Carey detailed relationships with her children and fans and addressed the pervasiveness of sexism in the music industry. She also participated in a conversation with Misty Copeland for Amazon Live.

In December 2020, Carey said she was exploring how to adapt the memoir into a limited series or film. The Guardian reported in February 2021 that Lee Daniels is working on a miniseries based on the book.

Release details

Commercial performance
Following its 2020 publication, The Meaning of Mariah Carey appeared on weekly book sales charts in multiple countries. In the United States, it debuted at number one on The New York Times Best Seller list in both the Hardcover Nonfiction and Combined Print & E-book Nonfiction categories, while entering at number three on Hardcover Frontlist Nonfiction and number six overall on Publishers Weekly charts based on NPD BookScan figures. It sold 62,557 units in its first three weeks of release in the United States according to the company. In Canada, the book debuted at number three on both The Globe and Mails Hardcover Non Fiction and the Toronto Stars Original Non-Fiction bestseller lists, which are based on data from BookNet Canada. It entered at number seven on The Sunday Times General Hardbacks chart, selling about 6,940 copies in the United Kingdom according to Nielsen BookScan.

Critical response
The book received positive reception from critics, general audiences, and Carey's fans alike. Based on 11 reviews, aggregation website Book Marks reported a "rave" response to the memoir. Numerous publications listed The Meaning of Mariah Carey in their rankings of the best music books or celebrity memoirs of 2020, including The Atlantic, the Financial Times, The Globe and Mail, The Guardian, the Irish Independent, NME, Pitchfork, Rolling Stone/Kirkus Reviews, The San Diego Union-Tribune, The Times, and Variety.

Critics reviewed the book's prose and structure. Writing for The New Yorker, Emily Lordi described it as "impressively well-written". The Atlantics Spencer Kornhaber cited  Carey's childhood memory about Ritz crackers as one of several brief reminiscences that "elevate The Meaning of Mariah Carey from celebrity propaganda into impressive storytelling". In the Los Angeles Times, Rich Juzwiak said short stories such as Carey's relationship with Jeter incorporate "tension and poignancy not typically seen in celebrity writing". According to Entertainment Weekly Mary Sollosi, the non-sequential chapters make the storytelling more powerful than if they were all in chronological order. In contrast, The New Republics Jo Livingstone thought the writing style makes the book feel "pieced together from interviews". Aisha Harris of NPR complimented the narrative structure but felt details about the success of Carey's projects are excessive. Alex Macpherson concurred in The Guardian, while Kirkus Reviews thought it contains no filler. Critics considered a paragraph that appears twice in different chapters as an editing error.

Representations of Carey's artistry were highlighted in reviews. As the book explains her creative methods, Adriana Ramirez wrote in the Pittsburgh Post-Gazette that it stands out from a typical memoir. Macpherson considered songs' inspirations and Carey's experiences collaborating with others some of the "most rewarding sections"; Lordi deemed passages describing her musical inspirations and writing style the "greatest revelations". According to Juzwiak, Carey's songwriting process from experiences to music unfolds poetically. Lisa Henry predicted in the Library Journal "the stories behind her lyrics will undoubtedly create a new appreciation for her work". The memoir's depiction of race was also noted. Regarding the subject, Macpherson thought it was "particularly acute", and Kornhaber felt it included "sharp analysis". Hannah Reich of ABC News described Carey's experiences with racism both as a child and in the music industry "deftly and powerfully rendered".

Some reviewers thought the memoir omits Carey's experiences with other people. Writing for the i, John Aizlewood criticized it for "concentrat[ing] on how unspeakably awful [Carey's] life was" with Mottola instead of mentioning more positive aspects of the relationship which he felt led to their marriage. As she and Eminem "volleyed diss tracks for years", Juzwiak thought the memoir does a disservice to readers by not acknowledging him, and Varietys Danielle Turchiano considered the choice odd because "there is still enough interest ... to warrant a chapter". Conversely, Cady Lang of Time and Michael Blackmon of BuzzFeed News viewed the exclusion as an effort to wrest control of her narrative. Rolling Stones Rob Sheffield was surprised Whitney Houston is first recognized in 1998 despite being perceived as her rival since 1990, and Lordi remarked there is "no hint of competition" with other musicians.

Lawsuits
Mariah's sister Alison filed a lawsuit against Carey with the New York Supreme Court in February 2021 seeking $1.25 million for emotional distress caused by the memoir. She disputes her depiction and says it was used to generate book sales. In the same court the following month, Mariah's brother, Morgan filed a lawsuit against Carey, Davis, and the publishers for emotional distress and defamation for his portrayal. A judge dismissed most of his claims in February 2022 except for two regarding drug-dealing and imprisonment which could potentially be defamatory.

See also

 The New York Times Non-Fiction Best Sellers of 2020

References

Works cited

External links
 
 

Music autobiographies
American memoirs
2020 non-fiction books
Mariah Carey
Literature by African-American women
Literature by Hispanic and Latino American women